Noa Tsurushima (鶴嶋乃愛 Tsurushima Noa; born 24 May 2001) is a Japanese actress and model.

Early life
Tsurushima was born in Kōchi Prefecture, Japan on 24 May 2001.

Filmography

Television series

Films

References

External links

 
 
 

2001 births
21st-century Japanese actresses
Living people
People from Kōchi Prefecture
Models from Kōchi Prefecture